Hoy voy a cambiar is a Mexican biographical miniseries produced by Santiago and Rubén Galindo for Televisa. The series is based on the life of Mexican singer and actress Lupita D'Alessio. It stars Gabriela Roel and Mariana Torres as the titular character and is narrated by Lupita D'Alessio. The series tells the story of Lupita D'Alessio from before she started her career as a singer and actress until the moment she was forced to leave everything for drugs.

Premise 
Because the series is based on D'Alessio's life, many other public figures, television programs and singers were portrayed in the series, such as José José in the years when he became known, Raúl Velasco in the early stages of the program Siempre en Domingo and Adal Ramones. Another production included in the series is La Oreja, which showed the falling out between Ernesto D'Alessio and his father Jorge Vargas more than ten years ago.

Cast

Main  
 Ari Telch as César Gómez
 Victoria Viera as Child Lupita D'Alessio
 Giovana Fuentes as Teen Lupita D'Alessio
 Sonia Couoh
 Eugenio Montessoro as Ignacio "Nacho" D'Alessio
 Anna Ciocchetti as Fanny Schatz
 Issabela Camil as Esther Millán
 Mariana Torres as Young Lupita D'Alessio
 Ferdinando Valencia as Jorge Vargas
 Gabriela Roel as Adult Lupita D'Alessio

Recurring 
 Christian Ramos as Héctor Fregoso
 Alejandro Tommasi as Ernesto Alonso
 Fabián Moura as Cristian Rossen
 Carlos Speitzer as Fernando Valero
 Isadora González as Nuri
 Axel Alcántara as Ernesto D'Alessio
 Joshua Gutiérrez as Jorge D'Alessio
 Paco Luna as César D'Alessio
 Raúl Olivo as Sabú
 Mauricio Castillo as Raúl Velasco
 Alex Trujillo as Julián
 Francisco Pizaña as Entrenador
 Ruth Rosas as Maestra
 Gerardo Santínez as Ludopatía

Production 
The script of the series is written by Rubén Galindo, who based the series on 14 hours of interviews with Lupita D'Alessio and her children. A total of 21 episodes have been confirmed so far.

Ratings

Mexico rating

U.S. rating

Episodes

Special

Awards and nominations

References

External links 
 

Las Estrellas original programming
Spanish-language television shows
2017 Mexican television series debuts
2017 Mexican television series endings
Televisa original programming